Drillia dakarensis is a species of sea snail, a marine gastropod mollusk in the family Drilliidae.

Description
The shell grows to a length of 12 mm. The snail lives in marine habitat and produces marine sediment. This snail is a predator and its shell contains
calcium carbonate.

Distribution
This species occurs in the demersal zone of the Atlantic Ocean off Western Africa (Cape Verde, Senegal, and Ghana).

References

  Tucker, J.K. 2004 Catalog of recent and fossil turrids (Mollusca: Gastropoda). Zootaxa 682:1–1295

External links
 
 Holotype in the MNHN, Paris

dakarensis
Gastropods described in 1956
Molluscs of the Atlantic Ocean
Gastropods of Cape Verde
Invertebrates of West Africa